Events from the year 1833 in Canada.

Incumbents
Monarch: William IV

Federal government
Parliament of Lower Canada: 14th 
Parliament of Upper Canada: 11th

Governors
Governor of the Canadas: Matthew Whitworth-Aylmer, 5th Baron Aylmer
Governor of New Brunswick: Sir Archibald Campbell, 1st Baronet
Governor of Nova Scotia: Thomas Nickleson Jeffery
Civil Governor of Newfoundland: Thomas John Cochrane
Governor of Prince Edward Island: Murray Maxwell

Events
September – William Lyon Mackenzie returns from the United Kingdom.
September 19 – Military riot at Montreal.
November 13 – Meteor showers at Niagara, Ontario.
November to December – William Lyon Mackenzie expelled three times and re-elected twice.
Royal William, formerly operating between Quebec and Halifax, becomes first steamship to cross Atlantic.

Births

April 22 – John Waldie, politician (died 1907)
July 7 – Henry Joseph Clarke, lawyer, politician and 3rd Premier of Manitoba (died 1889)
September 3 – Byron Moffatt Britton, politician, lawyer and lecturer (died 1920)
September 15 – Alexander Roberts Dunn, first Canadian awarded the Victoria Cross (died 1868)
October 13 – Edward Blake, politician and 2nd Premier of Ontario (died 1912)
November 24 – Antoine Labelle, priest and settler (died 1891)
December 10 – George Haddow, politician and merchant (died 1919)

Deaths
March 3 – James Bardin Palmer, land agent, lawyer, office holder, and politician (born 1771)
November 20 – Joel Stone, founder of Gananoque, Ontario (born 1749)

References 

 
Canada
Years of the 19th century in Canada
1833 in North America